The 2006 ABSA Currie Cup season was contested from June through to October. The Currie Cup is an annual domestic competition for rugby union clubs in South Africa. The tournament was controversial before it even began, with the Southern Spears saga regarding entry into the Super 14 and Currie Cup continuing.

The final was drawn between the Free State Cheetahs and the Blue Bulls 28-all at Vodacom Park. It was the first drawn final since the 1989 season. The 2006 final was the third Free State/Blue Bulls final in succession.

Competition

Changes from previous season
The structure of the competition changed for 2006. In 2005, all fourteen provincial teams played in the qualifying rounds of the Currie Cup, with the top eight teams going through to the Premier Division competition and the bottom six teams going through to the First Division tournament.

For 2006, it was decided to reduce the number of teams to just eight.

The two best non-entrenched teams in the 2006 Vodacom Cup competition would also participate in the Premier Division. The  won the Vodacom Cup competition and the  finished fifth to secure their places in the Premier Division.

In addition, the South Eastern Cape would be named as an entrenched team for 2006 only, as preparation for the Southern Spears' entry into the 2007 Super 14 season. However, the Southern Spears were later denied entry into the Super 14 competition and the South Eastern Cape's spot were given to  instead.

Format
All eight teams played a double round robin, meaning every team played fourteen matches in total.

Teams received four points for a win and two points for a draw. Bonus points were awarded to teams that scored 4 or more tries in a game, as well as to teams that lost a match by 7 points or less. Teams were ranked by points, then points difference (points scored less points conceded).

The top four teams qualified to the semi-finals.

Teams

Fixtures and results

|-
! width="100"|
! width="120"|Date
! width="100"|
! width="120"|Date
|- align=center bgcolor="#cedff2"
|Round 1
| June 23–24
|Round 9
| August 25–26
|- align=center bgcolor="#FFFFFF"
|Round 2
| June 30 - July 1
|Round 10
| September 1–2
|- align=center bgcolor="#cedff2"
|Round 3
| July 7–8
|Round 11
| September 8
|- align=center bgcolor="#FFFFFF"
|Round 4
| July 14–15
|Round 12
| September 15–16
|- align=center bgcolor="#cedff2"
|Round 5
| July 21–22
|Round 13
| September 22–23
|- align=center bgcolor="#FFFFFF"
|Round 6
| July 28–29
|Round 14
| September 29–30
|- align=center bgcolor="#cedff2"
|Round 7
| August 4–12
|Semi-Finals
| October 7
|- align=center bgcolor="#FFFFFF"
|Round 8
| August 18–19
|Final
| 14 October

Round 1

 Friday 23 June Pumas 18-25 Western Province Witbank

 Saturday 24 June Cheetahs 55-14 Griquas Bloemfontein

Round 2
 Friday 30 June Falcons 9-66 Cheetahs Brakpan

 Saturday 1 July Western Province 25-28 Sharks Cape Town
 Saturday 1 July Golden Lions 24-39 Blue Bulls Johannesburg

Round 3
 Friday 7 July Sharks 34-16 Pumas Durban
 Saturday 8 July Cheetahs 59-5 Golden Lions Bloemfontein
 Saturday 8 July Falcons 23-8 Griquas	Brakpan
 Saturday 8 July Blue Bulls 10-15 Western Province Pretoria

Round 4
 Friday 14 July Lions 32-19 Falcons Johannesburg
 Saturday 15 July Griquas 23-22 Sharks Kimberley
 Saturday 15 July Pumas 17-48 Blue Bulls Witbank
 Saturday 15 July Western Province 20-13 Cheetahs Cape Town

Round 5
 Friday 21 July Falcons 31-40 Western Province Brakpan
 Friday 21 July Blue Bulls 28-37 Sharks Pretoria
 Saturday 22 July Griquas 27-23 Golden Lions Kimberley
 Saturday 22 July Cheetahs 42-27 Pumas Bloemfontein

Round 6
 Friday 28 July Pumas 8-36 Falcons Witbank
 Saturday 29 July Blue Bulls 39-20 Griquas Pretoria
 Saturday 29 July Western Province 30-28 Golden Lions Cape Town
 Saturday 29 July Sharks 19-31 Cheetahs Durban

Round 7
 Friday 4 August Falcons 17-46 Sharks Brakpan
 Saturday 5 August Griquas 23-27 Western Province Kimberley
 Saturday 5 August Cheetahs 12-24 Blue Bulls Bloemfontein
 Saturday 5 August Golden Lions 74-15 Pumas Johannesburg
 Saturday 12 August Blue Bulls 17-19 Golden Lions Pretoria

Round 8
 Friday 18 August Falcons 13-27 Blue Bulls Brakpan
 Saturday 19 August Griquas 20-31 Cheetahs Kimberley
 Saturday 19 August Golden Lions 22-21 Sharks Johannesburg
 Saturday 19 August Western Province 43-10 Pumas Cape Town

Round 9
 Saturday 25 August Sharks 16-6 Western Province Durban
 Saturday 25 August Pumas 27-60 Griquas Witbank
 Sunday 26 August Cheetahs 78-8 Falcons Bloemfontein

Round 10
 Friday 1 September Pumas 14-82 Sharks Witbank

 Saturday 2 September Griquas 36-27 Falcons Kimberley

Round 11
 Friday 8 September Blue Bulls 66-3 Pumas Pretoria
 Friday 8 September Cheetahs 28-13 Western Province Bloemfontein
 Friday 8 September Sharks 60-8 Griquas Durban
 Friday 8 September Falcons 17-32 Golden Lions Brakpan

Round 12
 Friday 15 September Western Province 68-12 Falcons Cape Town
 Saturday 16 September Pumas 12-68 Cheetahs Witbank
 Saturday 16 September Golden Lions 66-13 Griquas Ellis Park
 Saturday 16 September Sharks 32-50 Blue Bulls Durban

Round 13

Round 14
 Friday 29 September Pumas 10-89 Golden Lions Witbank
 Saturday 30 September Western Province 55-17 Griquas Cape Town
 Saturday 30 September Sharks 48-10 Falcons Durban
 Saturday 30 September Blue Bulls 41-31 Cheetahs Pretoria

Standings

Points Breakdown
Four points for a win
Two points for a draw
One bonus point for a loss by seven points or less
One bonus point for scoring four or more tries in a match

Table Notes
P = Played, W = Won, D = Drew, L = Lost, PF = Points Scored (Points For), PA = Points Conceded (Points Against), PD = Points Difference (Points For minus Points Against), TF = Tries Scored, TA = Tries Conceded, BP = Bonus points, Pts = Total Points

Semi-finals

Final

At the end of regular time the scores were level at 25-25 and the match went into extra-time for the first time in the Currie Cup's 127-year history.  After 20 minutes of extra-time, the game was still tied, each team having managed to score no more than a penalty goal. In the absence of a tie-breaker, the match was drawn — the first time since 1989 that a final had been drawn — and, with no clear winner, the cup was shared by the two teams.

Statistics

Top point scorers

Top try scorers

References

 
2006
2006 in South African rugby union
2006 rugby union tournaments for clubs